Philometor, meaning "mother-loving", was a common royal epithet among Hellenistic monarchs:

 Antiochus VIII Philometor, Seleucid King
 Ariarathes VII Philometor, King of Cappadocia
 Attalus III Philometor Euergetes, King of Pergamon
 Cleopatra Philometor Soteira, Queen of Egypt
 Paerisades IV Philometor, King of the Bosporan Kingdom
 Ptolemy VI Philometor, King of Egypt
 Ptolemy XV Philopator Philometor Caesar, son of Cleopatra VII and Julius Caesar
 Seleucus V Philometor, Seleucid King
 Seleucus VII Philometor, Seleucid King

See also 
 Eupator (disambiguation)
 Philopator (disambiguation)
 Philadelphos (disambiguation)

Ancient Greek titles
Epithets